The Chambers Covered Bridge is a covered bridge located in Cottage Grove, Oregon, United States. It was built in 1925 to carry rail traffic hauling logs from the Lorane Valley to the J.H. Chambers Mill, a lumber mill which was located on an area between South Highway 99 and the Coast Fork Willamette River. The mill closed in the 1950s after a second fire burned the mill down. The railroad tracks were removed and the bridge was left. The mill property is now being developed as a housing development called Riverwalk. The Chambers Covered Railroad Bridge is the only remaining fully covered railroad bridge west of the Mississippi River.

Construction
It is a Howe truss design.

Preservation
In FY 2008, The National Historic Covered Bridge Preservation Program, administered by the Federal Highway Administration, awarded a grant of $1,315,370 to the City of Cottage Grove for the rehabilitation of the Chambers Covered Bridge, one of seven covered bridges in Oregon that received grants the same period.

Reconstruction
Chambers Covered Bridge was removed in 2010 and replaced with a carefully constructed bridge that is identical to the previous one. The new bridge is now open for pedestrians.

See also
 List of bridges on the National Register of Historic Places in Oregon
 List of Oregon covered bridges

References

External links

 Covered bridge history of Cottage Grove

Covered bridges in Lane County, Oregon
Bridges completed in 1925
Cottage Grove, Oregon
Covered bridges on the National Register of Historic Places in Oregon
Railroad bridges in Oregon
1925 establishments in Oregon
National Register of Historic Places in Lane County, Oregon
Railroad bridges on the National Register of Historic Places in Oregon
Wooden bridges in Oregon
Howe truss bridges in the United States